The St. Louis Fire of 1849 was a devastating fire that occurred on May 17, 1849 and destroyed a significant part of St. Louis, Missouri and many of the steamboats using the Mississippi River and Missouri River. This was the first fire in United States history in which it is known that a firefighter was killed in the line of duty. Captain Thomas B. Targee was killed while trying to blast a fire break. Targee Street was named for him.

Timeline of the fire

In the spring of 1849, the population of St. Louis was about 63,000 with a western boundary of the city extending to 11th Street. The city was about three quarters of a mile in width and had about three miles of riverfront filled with steamboats and other river craft. St. Louis, located near the junction of the Mississippi and Missouri rivers, was the last major city where travelers could get supplies before they headed west. Here travelers bought supplies and switched steamboats before going up the Missouri River to Omaha, Nebraska or other trail heads for the Oregon and California trails west. At the time of this fire, the city was also experiencing a cholera epidemic which would end up killing about 10% of the population (over 4,500). The town was booming as people came in from around the U.S. and abroad and bought supplies before heading overland to participate in the California Gold Rush.

On May 17, 1849 at 9:00 p.m. a fire alarm sounded in St. Louis. The paddle wheeled steamboat White Cloud on the river at the foot of Cherry Street was on fire. The volunteer fire department with nine hand engines and hose reel wagons promptly responded. The moorings holding White Cloud burned through and the burning steamboat drifted slowly down the Mississippi River, setting 22 other steam boats and several flatboats and barges on fire.

The flames leaped from the burning steamboats to buildings on the shore and was soon burning everything on the waterfront levee for four blocks. The fire extended to Main Street westward and crossing Olive Street. It completely gutted the three blocks between Olive and 2nd Street and went as far south as Market Street. It then ignited a large copper shop three blocks away and burned out two more city blocks. The volunteer firemen, after laboring for eight hours, were nearly completely demoralized and exhausted. The entire business district of the city appeared doomed unless something was done. Six businesses in front of the fire were loaded with kegs of black powder and blown up in succession. Captain Thomas B. Targee of Missouri Company No. 5 died while he was spreading powder into Phillips Music store, the last store chosen to be blown up.

This fire was the largest and most destructive fire St. Louis has ever experienced. When the fire was finally contained after 11 hours, 430 buildings were destroyed, 23 steamboats along with over a dozen other boats were lost, and three people had died including a fire captain. As a result of these fires, a new building code required new structures to be built of stone or brick and an extensive new water and sewage system was started.

See also
 St. Louis Fire Department

References

1849 fires in the United States
1849 in Missouri
Fires in Missouri
May 1849 events
1849 disasters in the United States
Urban fires in the United States
Maritime incidents in May 1849